Clemens Johannes Pauli (1835–1896) was a German-born American photographer and printer who produced panoramic maps with accompanying lists of landmarks at  his printing company in Milwaukee, Wisconsin. Several are held at the Library of Congress.

He served the U.S. Engineer Office in 1872 supervising surveying and sounding work.

Locations he made panoramic maps of include:
Ashland, Wisconsin
Benton Harbor, Michigan
Cedar Rapids, Iowa
Horicon, Wisconsin.
Peoria, Illinois
Port Huron, Michigan
South Bend, Indiana
Winona, Minnesota

Gallery

References

1835 births
1896 deaths
19th-century American photographers
19th-century German photographers
German printmakers
19th-century American printmakers
German emigrants to the United States